Pi Theta Epsilon is the scholastic honor society of the American Occupational Therapy Foundation that recognizes academic achievement among students in the field of occupational therapy.

The society was founded at the University of New Hampshire in 1959, and admitted to the Association of College Honor Societies in 1996.

Pi Theta Epsilon has 89 active chapters across the United States.

See also
 Association of College Honor Societies

External links
 
 ACHS Pi Theta Epsilon entry
 Pi Theta Epsilon chapter list at ACHS

References

Association of College Honor Societies
Honor societies
Student organizations established in 1959
1959 establishments in New Hampshire
University of New Hampshire